Deweyville Independent School District is a public school district based in the community of Deweyville, Texas (USA).

In 2009, the school district was rated "recognized" by the Texas Education Agency.

Schools
Deweyville High School
Deweyville Middle School
Deweyville Elementary School

References

External links
Deweyville ISD

School districts in Newton County, Texas